Juan Fernández Vilela (born 16 September 1948) is a former Spanish footballer. He competed in the men's tournament at the 1968 Summer Olympics.

References

External links
 

1948 births
Living people
Spanish footballers
Olympic footballers of Spain
Footballers at the 1968 Summer Olympics
Footballers from Ferrol, Spain
Association football midfielders
Racing de Ferrol footballers
RC Celta de Vigo players
Pontevedra CF footballers